LMD, formerly known as Lanka Monthly Digest, is an English language Sri Lankan business magazine. The magazine is owned by Media Services (Pvt) Ltd and was first issued in August 1994. The magazine is available in print and online versions. Hiran Hewavisenti is the magazine's editor-in-chief. LMD derives its revenue through both advertising and subscription fees. Monthly circulation is about 5,000 while monthly readership is around 30,000-40,000. The magazine has a subscriber base of about 1,800. Living and Discover Sri Lanka are the sister publications of the magazine.

Compiled lists and indices
LMD compiles and publishes popular company listings, rankings and indices.

LMD 100

Dubbed "Sri Lanka's Fortune 500." The magazine has been publishing the LMD 100 since the 1994/95 fiscal year. The latest edition, the 29th edition of LMD 100 was published for the fiscal year 2021/2022 in 2023. Sri Lankan conglomerate, Hayleys was ranked first for the fifth consecutive year in 2022.

Source: LMD 100

Sri Lankan of The Year
[[File:Jayantha Dhanapala.jpg|thumb|Sri Lankan diplomat, Jayantha Dhanapala was LMD'''s 2006 Sri Lankan of the Year]]

Source: lmd.lk Most Awarded 2021 LMD'' Most Awarded index tallies the cumulative awards won by business establishments in the respective calendar year.

References

External links

1994 establishments in Sri Lanka
Business magazines
Magazines published in Sri Lanka
Mass media in Colombo
English-language magazines
Magazines established in 1994
Monthly magazines